The 1969 Harelbeke–Antwerp–Harelbeke was the 12th edition of the E3 Harelbeke cycle race and was held on 22 March 1969. The race started and finished in Harelbeke. The race was won by Rik Van Looy of the Willem II–Gazelle team.

General classification

Notes

References

1969 in Belgian sport
1969